Lifford was a constituency represented in the Irish House of Commons until 1800.

Members of Parliament

References
Return of Members of Parliament (1878), vol. ii, p. 611.

Historic constituencies in County Donegal
Constituencies of the Parliament of Ireland (pre-1801)
1800 disestablishments in Ireland
Constituencies disestablished in 1800
Constituency